is a railway station on the Hohi Main Line, operated by JR Kyushu in Chūō-ku, Kumamoto, Japan.

Lines

Layout 
The station consists of two side platforms serving two tracks at grade under a road overpass. There is no station building, but both platforms have shelters. A staffed ticket booth is located on one of the platforms. Access to the other side platform is by means of a footbridge.

Management of the station has been outsourced to the JR Kyushu Tetsudou Eigyou Co., a wholly owned subsidiary of JR Kyushu specialising in station services. It staffs the ticket booth which is equipped with a POS machine but does not have a Midori no Madoguchi facility.

Adjacent stations

History
JR Kyushu opened the station on 15 July 1992 as an addition station on the existing track of the Hōhi Main Line.

Passenger statistics
In the fiscal year of 2016, the station was used by an average of 1,030 passengers daily (boarding passengers only), and it ranked 161st among the busiest stations of JR Kyushu.

See also
List of railway stations in Japan

References

External links
Heisei (JR Kyushu)

Railway stations in Kumamoto Prefecture
Railway stations in Japan opened in 1992